Minquartia is a monotypic genus of flowering plants in the Olacaceae family containing the single species Minquartia guianensis (also called black manwood or huambula). It is found in Bolivia, Brazil, Colombia, Costa Rica, Ecuador, French Guiana, Guyana, Nicaragua, Panama, Peru, Suriname, and Venezuela.

One of the phytochemicals it contains is lichexanthone.

References

Olacaceae
Monotypic Santalales genera
Near threatened plants
Trees of Bolivia
Trees of Brazil
Trees of Colombia
Trees of Costa Rica
Trees of Ecuador
Trees of French Guiana
Trees of Guyana
Trees of Nicaragua
Trees of Panama
Trees of Peru
Trees of Suriname
Trees of Venezuela
Taxonomy articles created by Polbot